PTMC may refer to:

 Parents Television and Media Council, American media advocacy group
 Poly(trimethylene carbonate), an organic polymer
 Post Terran Mining Corporation, a fictional company in Descent (video game)